The paanga is the currency of Tonga. It is controlled by the National Reserve Bank of Tonga (Pangikē Pule Fakafonua o Tonga) in Nukualofa. The paanga is not convertible and is pegged to a basket of currencies comprising the Australian, New Zealand, and United States dollars and the Japanese yen.

The paanga is subdivided into 100 seniti. The ISO code is TOP, and the usual abbreviation is T$ (¢ for seniti). In Tonga, the paanga is often referred to in English as the dollar, the seniti as the cent and the hau as the union. There is also the unit of hau (1 hau = 100 paanga), but this is not used in everyday life and can be found only on commemorative coins of higher denominations.

Etymology

Paanga is the Tongan name for Entada phaseoloides, also called the box bean or St. Thomas's bean, a bean-like vine producing large pods with large reddish-brown seeds. The seeds are roundish, up to 5 cm diameter and 1 or 2 cm thick. When strung together they are used as anklets, part of the kailao dance costume. They were also used as playing pieces in an ancient disc-throwing game, lafo.

On 1 December 1806 Tongans attacked the passing ship Port-au-Prince near Lifuka in order to take it over. They failed, as the crew sank the vessel. The chief of Haapai, Fīnau Ulukālala, resorted to the next plan, to plunder whatever was worthwhile. On his inspection tour, he found the ship's cash. Not knowing what money was, he considered the coins as paanga. Finally, not seeing anything of value, he ordered the remains of the ship to be burned; most of the crew were also reported to be massacred. It was much later that William Mariner, the only survivor of this attack, told him that those pieces of metal were of great value and not merely playing stones. Mariner also passed down the following statement of Fīnau Ulukālala as he began to understand the value of these pieces to the European sailors:
If money were made of iron and could be converted into knives, axes and chisels there would be some sense in placing a value on it; but as it is, I see none. If a man has more yams than he wants, let him exchange some of them away for pork. [...] Certainly money is much handier and more convenient but then, as it will not spoil by being kept, people will store it up instead of sharing it out as a chief ought to do, and thus become selfish. [...] I understand now very well what it is that makes the papālangi [white men] so selfish –  it is this money!

When Tonga introduced decimal currency, it decided not to call the main unit the dollar because the native word, tola, translated into a pig's snout, the soft end of a coconut, or, in vulgar language, a mouth. Paanga, on the other hand, translated into money.

History 

The paanga was introduced on 3 April 1967. It replaced the pound at a rate of 1 pound = 2 paanga. Until 11 February 1991, the pa'anga was pegged to the Australian dollar at par. Since that time, a basket of currencies is taken and the paanga has continuously declined. Official exchange rates are released daily by the National Reserve Bank of Tonga.

Coins 

In 1967, circulating coins were introduced in denominations of 1, 2, 5, 10, 20 and 50 seniti and 1 and 2 paanga. The 1 and 2 seniti were struck in bronze with the other denominations in cupro-nickel. The 50 seniti, 1, and 2 paanga were only struck in small numbers as these denominations were also issued in note form. In 1974, dodecagonal (twelve-sided) 50 seniti were introduced but 50 seniti banknotes continued to be issued until 1983. In 1974, 1 seniti coins were struck in brass rather than bronze but reverted to bronze in 1975.

In 1975, a new series of coins was issued, themed around FAO and food production and featuring a new portrait style effigy of the king. This was followed by another series of similar theme in 1981. 1 and 2 Pa'anga coins continued to be issued. Starting in 1978 the 1 Pa'anga coins were redesigned with an innovative, or at least unique rectangular shape while the 2 Pa'anga (depicted on the right) remained round and continued to be one of the world's largest circulating coins at the time ( diameter 44.5 millimetres/1.75 inches ), larger even than standard "English crown sized" coins. The reverses of both were changed annually to commemorate a different FAO goal or event. Later seven sided Christmas themed pa'anga coins also exist. However, due to the 2 Pa'anga coin's large size and weight and the awkward shape of the 1 pa'anga, they failed to compete against the 1 and 2 Pa'anga notes that were simultaneously issued so production of these denominations ended in the 1980s due to low commercial demand. All 1 and 2 pa'anga coins still remain legal tender but are rarely used.

in 2002, nickel-plated steel replaced cupro-nickel in the 10, 20, and 50 seniti and the 5 seniti in 2005. The change did not occur in the 5 seniti initially as there was still a reasonable quantity of coins in stock at the time of the change. The move was made to reduce costs in production of the coins. The weight of the coins was also slightly reduced, although they remained the same approximate size as earlier dated coins. In 2011, commercial demand for 20 and 50 seniti prompted these denominations to be issued featuring the effigy of Tupou IV posthumous, who had died in 2006. A new obverse design for George Tupou V had not yet been made or selected at this time, possibly due to increased health concerns regarding the latter monarch, who died in March 2012.

For a brief period, some of the higher denomination coinage from the 1967–1968 series was "countermarked" with commemoration stamps that were added to the coin after being struck. The most distinct of these is Oil Search series which was plated in gold or "gilt". Some countermarked pieces were released into circulation but many were also sold to collectors.

Current circulating coins are in denominations of 1, 2, 5, 10, 20 and 50 seniti. The one and two seniti coins are still valid but are becoming less common in circulation due to high production cost and low value and may only be readily available for months after a release by the banks. Total prices in shops are usually rounded to the nearest 5 or 10 seniti.

In 2011, Tonga had announced plans to introduce a new and more modern series of coins shortly after neighboring Samoa and Fiji had done so, and on 3 March 2015 the Royal Australian Mint announced the production of new coins that would begin release later that year. Dignitaries, including Tongan Princess Angelika Tuku'aho whose father will feature on her county's coins, took turns striking the coins at a ceremony. "I'm very proud and honoured to be able to strike the coins today," she said. "This is also in celebration of His Majesty's coronation that is coming up in July."

The first series of coins showed Queen Salote Tupou III, two years after her death. The reverse designs were Tu'i Malila (a radiated tortoise presented to the Tongan royal family by Captain Cook in 1777) on the 1 and 2 seniti, wheat sheaves and a stylized depiction of the constellation Crux on the 5 and 10 seniti, and the Royal Tongan coat of arms on the higher denominations. From 1968, the portrait of King Taufa'ahau Tupou IV appeared, facing right, with the first year issue commemorating the coronation event. Since 1975, all coins have borne the word "Tonga" on the obverse and the inscription "Fakalahi meakai" (Tongan: "Grow more food") and the denomination on the reverse. All 1975–2011 coins are FAO themed. The King is shown in military uniform in portrait format rather than profile.

As part of a coinage reform, new coins were minted in 2015 by the Royal Australian Mint.

Specifications and designs are:

The King is shown facing on the 10, 20, and 50 seniti, under the initials FAO.

Banknotes

From 1974, the portrait of King Taufa'ahau Tupou IV appeared on the notes.  paanga notes were issued until 1983, with 20 paanga notes introduced in 1985, followed by 50 paanga in 1988. In 1992, the National Reserve Bank of Tonga took over production of paper money. On 30 July 2008, a new banknote series with greater security features was introduced featuring George Tupou V and a redesigned look. During this issue, a 100 paanga banknote was introduced for the first time.

The obverse of Tongan notes features text in the Tongan language and shows the portrait of the monarch. The reverse is in English language and shows typical motives and landmarks of Tonga: the Haamonga a Maui Trilithon, a humpback whale, burial mounds, school students and rugby players, the royal palace, the Tongan Development Bank, the Port of Vavau (twice, once depicted as it was around 1900, and the other in contemporary depiction), and ngatu making.

On June 29, 2015, the National Reserve Bank of Tonga introduced a new family of paanga banknotes in six denominations, from 2 to 100 paanga. Banknotes of 50 and 100 paanga are made of a paper/polymer hybrid substrate. They feature a portrait of the current king of Tonga, Tupou VI.

See also
 Economy of Tonga

References

Circulating currencies
Currencies of the Commonwealth of Nations
Currencies of Oceania
Paanga
Currencies introduced in 1967